Pyrocleptria is a genus of moths of the family Noctuidae. Some authors consider it to be a subgenus of Periphanes.

Species
 Pyrocleptria cora Eversmann, 1837
 Pyrocleptria naumanni Krušek & Behounek, 1996

References
 Krušek, K. & Behounek, G. (1996). Zeitschrift der Arbeitsgemeinschaft der Österreichischen Entomologen 48: 1-2.
 Natural History Museum Lepidoptera genus database

Heliothinae